Northicote School was a co-educational secondary school located in the city Wolverhampton, West Midlands, England. The age range of the school was 11-18. It had specialist status in mathematics and computing. 

It was the first school in Britain to be condemned as "failing" by OFSTED shortly after the organisation's creation in 1992, but within five years had been transformed to a "successful and over-subscribed school" — a remarkable turnaround that saw head teacher Geoff Hampton knighted for his services to education. Sir Geoff has since departed for a Professor's role at University of Wolverhampton. The last headteacher of the school was Mr R. Davis.

The Northicote School was built as a bilateral school, having both secondary modern and grammar streams during the 1950s to serve the expanding Bushbury area of Wolverhampton, though during the 1970s it converted to a comprehensive school. The school was informed in 2007 that it was being merged with Pendeford Business and Enterprise College to form an academy under controversial plans.

In the academic year 2010–11 the school merged with Pendeford Business and Enterprise College to become the North East Wolverhampton Academy. The combined school was originally located over both former school sites before relocating to a newly constructed and refurbished campus in September 2014 at the former Pendeford Business and Enterprise College site. Northicote Campus was subsequently demolished although a few months later contractors working for the council repainted the "School Keep Clear" markings outside the former site.

External links
 North East Wolverhampton Academy website

Defunct schools in Wolverhampton
Educational institutions disestablished in 2011
2011 disestablishments in England